Jaworze Dolne  is a village in the administrative district of Gmina Pilzno, within Dębica County, Subcarpathian Voivodeship, in south-eastern Poland.

References

Jaworze Dolne